Lee Ann Remick (December 14, 1935 – July 2, 1991) was an American actress and singer. She was nominated for the Academy Award for Best Actress for the film Days of Wine and Roses (1962), and for the 1966 Tony Award for Best Actress in a Play for her Broadway theatre performance in Wait Until Dark.

Remick made her film debut in A Face in the Crowd (1957). Her other notable film roles include Anatomy of a Murder (1959), Wild River (1960), No Way to Treat a Lady (1968), The Detective (1968), The Omen (1976), and The Europeans (1979). She won Golden Globe Awards for the TV film The Blue Knight (1973), and for playing the title role in the miniseries Jennie: Lady Randolph Churchill (1974). For the latter role, she also won the BAFTA TV Award for Best Actress. In April 1991, she received a star on the Hollywood Walk of Fame.

Early life
Remick was born in Quincy, Massachusetts, the daughter of Gertrude Margaret (two sources say Patricia) (née Waldo), an actress, and Francis Edwin "Frank" Remick, who owned a department store. She had one older brother, Bruce. One of her maternal great-grandmothers, Eliza Duffield, was a preacher born in England.

Remick attended the Swoboda School of Dance, The Hewitt School, and studied acting at Barnard College and the Actors Studio.

Career

Broadway and television
Remick made her Broadway theatre debut in 1953 with Be Your Age. She began guest starring on episodes of TV anthology series such as Armstrong Circle Theatre, Studio One in Hollywood, Robert Montgomery Presents, Kraft Theatre and Playhouse 90.

Early films
Remick made her film debut in Elia Kazan's A Face in the Crowd (1957). While filming the movie in Arkansas, Remick lived with a local family and practiced baton twirling so that she would be believable as the teenager who wins the attention of Lonesome Rhodes (played by Andy Griffith).

After appearing as Eula Varner, the hot-blooded daughter-in-law of Will Varner (Orson Welles) in The Long, Hot Summer (1958), she appeared in These Thousand Hills (1959) as a dance hall girl, both for 20th Century Fox.

Film stardom
Remick came to prominence portraying a rape victim whose husband is tried for killing her attacker in Otto Preminger's Anatomy of a Murder (1959).

She made a second film with Kazan, Wild River (1960), which co-starred Montgomery Clift and Jo Van Fleet. That year she played Miranda in a television version of The Tempest with Richard Burton.

Remick was top-billed in Sanctuary (1961) alongside Yves Montand. She did The Farmer's Daughter (1962) on television. She starred opposite Glenn Ford in the Blake Edwards suspense-thriller Experiment in Terror (1962). That same year she was nominated for an Academy Award for Best Actress for her performance as the alcoholic wife of Jack Lemmon in Days of Wine and Roses (1962), also directed by Edwards. Bette Davis, also nominated that year for What Ever Happened to Baby Jane?, said, "Miss Remick's performance astonished me, and I thought, if I lose the Oscar, it will be to her." They both lost to Anne Bancroft in The Miracle Worker.

When Marilyn Monroe was fired during the filming of the comedy Something's Got to Give, the studio announced that Remick would be her replacement. Co-star Dean Martin refused to continue, however, saying that while he admired Remick, he had signed onto the picture strictly to be able to work with Monroe. Remick did a thriller, The Running Man (1963), with Laurence Harvey and a comedy, The Wheeler Dealers (also 1963), with James Garner.

Return to Broadway and 1965 films
Remick next appeared in the 1964 Broadway musical Anyone Can Whistle, with music and lyrics by Stephen Sondheim and a book and direction by Arthur Laurents, which ran for only a week. Remick's performance is captured on the original cast recording. This began a lifelong friendship between Remick and Sondheim, and she later appeared in the 1985 concert version of his musical Follies.

Remick returned to films with Baby the Rain Must Fall (1965), with Steve McQueen from a script by Horton Foote, and The Hallelujah Trail (1965) with Burt Lancaster.

In 1966, she starred in the Broadway play Wait Until Dark under the direction of Arthur Penn and co-starring Robert Duvall. It was a big success and ran for 373 performances; Remick was nominated for a Tony award for Best Actress (Dramatic). It was adapted into a successful film the following year starring Audrey Hepburn.

More films and 1970s
She performed in Damn Yankees! (1967) for TV and starred in No Way to Treat a Lady (1968) with Rod Steiger and George Segal, The Detective (1968) with Frank Sinatra, and Hard Contract (1969) with James Coburn.

Remick visited the UK to make Loot (1970) and A Severed Head (1971). Back in the US she was in Paul Newman's Sometimes a Great Notion (1971). 

She appeared in Hennessy (1975), reuniting her with Rod Steiger. She co-starred with Gregory Peck in the 1976 horror film The Omen, in which her character's adopted son, Damien, is revealed to be the Antichrist. The film was a commercial success.

Remick followed it up with leading actress roles in Telefon (1977), with Charles Bronson; The Medusa Touch (1978) with Richard Burton; the television mini-series Wheels (1979) with Rock Hudson; Ike: The War Years (1979) portraying Kay Summersby; and The Europeans (1979) for director James Ivory.

Remick starred in many TV movies beginning with The Man Who Came to Dinner (1972) with Orson Welles. She followed it with Summer and Smoke (1972) for British TV; And No One Could Save Her (1973); Of Men and Women (1973), an unsuccessful pilot; The Blue Knight (1973) with William Holden; A Delicate Balance (1973) with Katharine Hepburn; QB VII (1974); Touch Me Not a.k.a. The Hunted (1974); Jennie: Lady Randolph Churchill (1975), playing the title role, which earned her an Emmy nomination; Hustling (1975) with Jill Clayburgh; A Girl Named Sooner (1975); Breaking Up (1978); and Torn Between Two Lovers (1979) with George Peppard.

1980s
Remick played Margaret Sullavan in Haywire (1980). She had the lead in The Women's Room (1980), and supported in The Competition (1980) and Tribute (1980), the latter with Lemmon.

Remick starred in The Letter (1982), The Gift of Love: A Christmas Story (1983) and a TV adaptation of I Do! I Do! (1984). She had a role in the miniseries Mistral's Daughter (1984), adapted from the novel by Judith Krantz. The reviewer of The New York Times praised Remick for portraying Kate "to fresh-faced clawing perfection".

Remick was in Rearview Mirror (1984), Toughlove (1985), Of Pure Blood (1986), and Nutcracker: Money, Madness & Murder (1987). She went to Australia to make Emma's War (1987).

Remick's final performances include The Vision (1987) with Dirk Bogarde, Jesse (1988), Bridge to Silence (1989) and playing Sarah Bernhardt in Around the World in 80 Days (1989). Her last performance was the lead in a TV movie Dark Holiday (1989).

Recognition
Remick was awarded the Women in Film Crystal Award in 1990.

She has a star in the Motion Pictures section on the Hollywood Walk of Fame at 6104 Hollywood Boulevard. (The Hollywood Walk of Fame site lists it at 1615 Vine Street.) It was dedicated on April 29, 1991.

Personal life

Remick married producer Bill Colleran, whose credits include Your Hit Parade, The Dean Martin Show and The Judy Garland Show, on August 3, 1957. They had two children, Katherine Lee Colleran (b. January 27, 1959) and Matthew Remick Colleran (b. June 7, 1961). Remick and Colleran divorced in 1968.

Remick married British producer William Rory "Kip" Gowans on December 18, 1970. He was an assistant director on such films as Darling (1965), Far from the Madding Crowd (1967) and The Lion in Winter (1968) before they married, and afterwards worked on Sleuth (1972), The Man Who Fell to Earth (1976) and The Human Factor (1979). She moved with Gowans to England and remained married to him until her death. She starred in four telefilms he produced, The Women's Room (1980), The Letter (1982), Rearview Mirror (1984) and Of Pure Blood (1986). Remick and Gowans spent time in both England and Osterville, Massachusetts, which she considered her "true home".

Through her daughter, Remick had two grandchildren.

In the spring of 1989 Remick was diagnosed with kidney cancer, from which she died on July 2, 1991 at the age of 55.

Popular culture
 
Remick was the subject of "Lee Remick", the 1978 debut single by the Australian indie rock band The Go-Betweens. For some reason, songwriter Robert Forster thought Remick was from Ireland, and references this in the song. In reality, Remick was American-born and raised (as were her parents); after 1970, she divided her time between England (where she had family ancestry) and the US. 

The British indie rock band Hefner recorded a song titled "Lee Remick" in 1998, unrelated to the Go-Betweens' single.

Filmography

Film

Television

References

External links

 
 
 
 
 Lee Remick at filmreference.com

1935 births
1991 deaths
20th-century American actresses
Actresses from Los Angeles
Actresses from Massachusetts
American expatriates in the United Kingdom
American film actresses
American stage actresses
American musical theatre actresses
American people of English descent
American television actresses
Best Actress BAFTA Award (television) winners
Barnard College alumni
Best Drama Actress Golden Globe (television) winners
Deaths from cancer in California
Deaths from kidney cancer
Deaths from liver cancer
People from Quincy, Massachusetts
20th-century American singers
People from Osterville, Massachusetts
20th-century American women singers
Hewitt School alumni